CCC Kei Yuen College is an aided co-ed Secondary school, mainly for band 1 students in Yuen Long. The school is located in Fung Yau Street East, established in 1982. CCC Kei Yuen College is a Christian grammar school founded by the Hong Kong Council of the Church of Christ in China (HKCCCC).

School motto 
We will in all things grow up into Him who is the head, that is, Christ. (Ephesian 4:15)

Extra-curricular activities

Academic 
English debate team, English writer, English speech team, English Drama and Movie Making Society, Scrabble team, Campus journalist, Economic Team, Chinese Club, Chinese speech team, Mandarin(Putonghua) speech team, Mathematics club, ICT club, Physics club, Science Club, Biology Club

Service 
CYC, Girl Guides, JPC, Boy Scouts, librarian, Red Cross and Air Cadet Crops

Religious 
Fellowship

Interest 
Home Economics Club, Design and Technology Club, Robot Club and Transport Club

Art 
Art group, Choir, WindBand, Woodwind Class, Drama Club and pop music club

Sports 
Judo Club, Football club, Badminton team, Girl basketball team, Boy volleyball team, Girl volleyball team, Boy Basketball Team,E-sports club

Houses 
Divided into 4 houses, they are RED, YELLOW, BLUE and GREEN respectively, every student will be arranged to one of them when they are form 1.

Subjects 
CCC Kei Yuen College highly values the learning of English.

There are 15 subjects at Junior Secondary levels (S.1–3) adopt English as the medium of instruction.

These subjects are :English, Mathematics, Liberal Studies, Integrated Science, Physics, Chemistry, Biology, Geography, Computer Literacy, History, Visual Arts, Physical Education, Design and Technology, Music, Home Economics.

Promote to S.1–3(2017/2018)

Promote to S.4 (2017/2018)

Campus 
CCC Kei Yuen College is located in the South-East of Yuen Long, with 7000-meter-square area. Beautiful view can be found and seen. New Playground is finished in the school year 2015/2016 and opened since 2017-9-1.

Facilities:
 29 Classrooms
 4 Laboratories
  Biology Laboratory
  Chemistry Laboratory
  Physics Laboratory
  Integrated Science Laboratory
  Playground
 Covered Playground
 Man Changing Room
 Lady Changing Room
 Multimedia Learning Center 
 Student Activity Centre, SAC
 4 Staff Rooms
 Geography Room
 Music Room
 Computer Room
 Art Room
 Needle Work Room
 Home Economics Room
 English Corner
 Design and Technology Room
 Library
 Student Union Room
 Medical Room
 Conference Room
 Counselling Room
 Rainbow tuck shop
 Parents resource room

Outstanding students getting good performance in HKDSE 
http://www.ccckyc.edu.hk/news/DSE/DES.jpg 
In the 2017 HKDSE, the average passing rate of all subjects in our school was 96%. This was higher than the Hong Kong average.

In the 4 core subjects (Chinese Language, English Language, Mathematics and Liberal Studies), the average passing rate was 97%. This was higher than the Hong Kong average.

5** ~ 4

Percentage HIGHER than those of all schools in Hong Kong

Chinese Language, Liberal Studies, Physics, Chinese Literature, Chinese History, History,

Mathematics, Mathematics (Calculus & Statistics), Mathematics (Algebra & Calculus),

Chemistry, Business, Accounting & Financial Studies, Visual Arts

Level
	

No. attained

5 or above
	

117

References

http://www.ccckyc.edu.hk/adm/sub/index.html 

Protestant secondary schools in Hong Kong
Hong Kong Council of the Church of Christ in China
1982 establishments in Hong Kong
Yuen Long